The Guy Armoured Car was a British armoured car produced in limited numbers during Second World War. The car saw limited action during the Battle of France.

The manufacturer had insufficient capacity for production of the armoured car alongside their artillery tractors, so the design and construction techniques were passed to Rootes and used as a basis for the Humber Armoured Car

Development
In 1938, Guy Motors built five Guy Quad armoured car prototypes to a design by the Woolwich Arsenal based on the Quad Ant artillery tractor chassis. In early 1938, a number of different 4×4 chassis from British and foreign manufacturers had been tested to see which was the best for development of a new line of armoured cars to replace those older designs in use. By September, three armoured cars had been built by Guy. While chassis with more advanced features were seen as having better potential, it was decided that in order to get production under way the Guy chassis was preferred.

The vehicles successfully completed troop trials and from 1939–1940 a further 101 of the armoured cars – initially designated "Tank, Light, (Wheeled) Mark I" – were produced. While the contract specification had been for riveted construction, they were actually welded following Guy's suggestion that this would be more suitable and effective. To that end, they developed the necessary techniques including rotating jigs, which meant the bodies and turrets could be produced quicker and cheaper. The Royal Commission for Awards to Inventors recognised this after the war.

The vehicle had a welded hull (making it the first British armoured car with an all-welded construction) with a sloped glacis plate. Above the centre of the hull was mounted a turret with two Vickers or Besa machine guns. The engine was located at the rear. The vehicle carried a No. 19 radio set.

The body of the Guy vehicle formed the basis of the later Humber Armoured Car, which employed a new chassis.

Service history
Six cars were sent to France with the British Expeditionary Force (BEF), but were lost when France fell to the Germans. Four cars, two each with the 12th Lancers and 2nd Northamptonshire Yeomanry, had their guns removed and additional seats fitted in 1940 for use in the Coats Mission to evacuate King George VI, Queen Elizabeth, Princess Elizabeth and Princess Margaret in the event of German invasion. The rest served with different British Army, Belgian Army, Danish and Dutch units stationed in Britain. By 1943, they were replaced by more modern vehicles.

Variants
 Mk I – original version. 50 units built.
 Mk IA – was armed with Besa 15 mm and 7.92 mm Besa air-cooled machine guns instead of the Vickers. 51 units built.

Notes

References

Sources
White, B T Armoured Cars - Daimler, Guy, Daimler, Humber, AEC AFV Profile No 21, Profile Publishing, Windsor
George Forty - World War Two Armoured Fighting Vehicles and Self-Propelled Artillery, Osprey Publishing 1996, .
I. Moschanskiy - Armored vehicles of the Great Britain 1939-1945 part 2, Modelist-Konstruktor, Bronekollektsiya 1999-02 (И. Мощанский - Бронетанковая техника Великобритании 1939-1945 часть 2, Моделист-Конструктор, Бронеколлекция 1999-02).
Armoured Car, Guy Mark 1 (E1965.44) - Accession record at Tank Museum

External links

Images of a Quad Ant.
Info on a Quad Ant still running.

World War II armoured cars
World War II armoured fighting vehicles of the United Kingdom
Armoured cars of the United Kingdom
Military vehicles introduced in the 1930s